Karosa LC 937 (known as Karosa GT 11) is a long-distance coach produced by bus manufacturer Karosa from the Czech Republic, produced from 1994 to 1996.

Construction features 
Karosa LC 937 is model of Karosa 900 series. LC 937 is unified with intercity bus models such as C 934 and B 932, but has different design. Body is semi-self-supporting with frame and engine with manual gearbox is placed in the rear part. Only rear axle is propulsed. Front axle is independent, rear axle is solid. All axles are mounted on air suspension. On the right side are two doors. Inside are used high padded seats. Drivers cab is not separated from the rest of the vehicle.

Production and operation 
In the years 1994 to 1996 was made only 16 buses.

Historical vehicles 
empty

See also 

 List of buses

Buses manufactured by Karosa
Buses of the Czech Republic